Greek painting may refer to:
 Greek art
 Greek Bronze Age art
 Greek Neolithic art
 Ancient Greek art
 Ancient Greek vase painting
 East Greek vase painting
 Hellenistic art
 Modern Greek art
 Culture of Greece#Painting

See also
 Pottery of ancient Greece